Berrettini is an Italian surname. Notable people with the surname include:

Jacopo Berrettini (born 1998), Italian tennis player
Matteo Berrettini (born 1996), Italian tennis player
Pietro Berrettini (1596/7 – 1669), better known as Pietro da Cortona, Italian Baroque painter and architect

Italian-language surnames